Filipendula vulgaris, commonly known as dropwort or fern-leaf dropwort, is a perennial herbaceous plant in the family Rosaceae, closely related to meadowsweet (Filipendula ulmaria). It is found in dry pastures across much of Europe and central and northern Asia, mostly on lime.

The crushed leaves and roots have a scent of the oil of wintergreen (methyl salicylate).

Taxonomy and naming
The genus name Filipendula comes from Latin filum ("thread") and pendulus ("hanging") in reference to the root tubers that hang from the roots in some species. The specific epithet vulgaris means "common". The English name "dropwort" comes from the tubers that hang like drops from the root.

Description
The flowers appear in dense clusters from late spring to midsummer atop sparsely leafed stems about 30 cm tall.

This plant prefers full sun or partial shade. It is more tolerant of dry conditions than most other members of its genus. It is a perennial of chalk and limestone downs and on heaths on other basic rocks.

Cultivation
Propagation is by seed and the division of the creeping roots. The tuberous roots and young leaves can be cooked as a vegetable or eaten raw as a salad. The taste is bitter sweet. The mature leaves smell of oil of wintergreen when crushed, due to the release of methyl salicylate.

References

vulgaris